James Taggart may refer to:

 Sir James Taggart (1849-1929) Lord Provost of Aberdeen 1914 to 1919
 James Gordon Taggart (1892–1974), Canadian civil servant and politician
 General James Taggart (Wing Commander), fictional character in the video game Wing Commander
 James Taggart (Atlas Shrugged), fictional character in the novel Atlas Shrugged
 Jim Taggart, lead character in British detective drama series Taggart
 Jim Taggart (Eureka), character in US science fiction series Eureka